Karl Kae Knecht (December 4, 1883 – July 28, 1972) was an American artist who was the cartoonist for the Evansville Courier (now Courier & Press) from 1906 to 1960 and was instrumental in the founding of Evansville's Mesker Park Zoo.  His work was the subject of a book, The World of Karl Kae Knecht Through His Cartoons by Philip C. Ensley, published in 1979 by University of Evansville Press.

Personal life
Knecht was born in 1883 in Dakota Territory and grew up in Illinois. He had a sister, Fay and married Jennie E. Moore of Evansville (daughter of Elwood Moore) on August 22, 1918.

He enjoyed circuses and performing as a clown, and was a founding member of the "Circus Fans' Association", serving as its first secretary-treasurer starting in 1926.

Career
He studied at the Chicago Art Institute. In 1906, Knecht became the cartoonist for the Evansville Courier and later served as staff photographer. Until 1954, Knecht's work appeared on the front page, when it was moved to the editorial page.

References

External links
 The Karl Kae Knecht Collection of digitized cartoons, Evansville Vanderburgh Public Library

Further reading

 "The most enthusiastic circus fan in America is Karl Kae Knecht who has just entered upon his year as cartoonist for the Evanville Courier ..." 

Philip C. Ensley. The world of Karl Kae Knecht through his cartoons. University of Evansville Press, 1979.

1883 births
1972 deaths
American cartoonists
People from Evansville, Indiana
American people of German descent